Uvala is a village in the municipality of Istočni Drvar (East Drvar), Bosnia and Herzegovina.

Demographics 
According to the 2013 census, its population was 38, all Serbs.

References

Populated places in Istočni Drvar